The 1979–80 Arkansas Razorbacks men's basketball team represented the University of Arkansas in the 1979–80 college basketball season. The Razorbacks played their home games in Barnhill Arena in Fayetteville, Arkansas. It was Eddie Sutton's sixth season as head coach of the Hogs. The Razorbacks finished second in the Southwest Conference regular season standings with a conference record of 13–3 and an overall record of 21-8. 

The Razorbacks earned an at-large bid to the NCAA tournament, Arkansas's eighth appearance in the tournament overall and fourth consecutive appearance, following appearances in the 1978 Final Four and the 1979 Elite Eight.

Arkansas entered the AP Poll at #20 on December 10th, 1979, rising to #19 on December 26th before consecutive losses knocked the Hogs out of the poll for the rest of the season. 

Sophomore center Scott Hastings was named to the All-SWC First Team. 

The 1979–80 season is also noteworthy for featuring the longest game in Razorback history, an 84–90 triple-overtime loss at Houston.

Roster

Schedule and results
Schedule retrieved from HogStats.com.

|-
!colspan=12 style=| Regular season

|-
!colspan=12 style=| Exhibition

|-
!colspan=12 style=| Regular season

|-
!colspan=12 style=|  SWC tournament

|-
!colspan=12 style=|  NCAA tournament

References

Arkansas Razorbacks
Arkansas Razorbacks men's basketball seasons
Arkansas